Holy Child School is the oldest known English-medium school in Jalpaiguri City, West Bengal, India. It has classes from Kindergarten, [Prep.], Class I up to Class XII and is affiliated to the Council for the Indian School Certificate Examination, New Delhi. It is located at Shiristala Avenue on the Jalpaiguri-Siliguri Road leading to National Highway 31(D) which connects the city of Jalpaiguri with the rest of the country by road(s).

Origin
Holy Child School in Jalpaiguri was opened in February 1973. It is a girls' school where the boys are accommodated according to the need and decision of the governing body.

Nature
The school is an unaided Christian minority school. It includes classes from KG to XII. The medium of instruction is English with Bengali and Hindi being offered as second and third languages respectively. The course that is followed is the I.C.S.E 10-year course and from 2004 ISC science and commerce is introduced.

Notable alumni
Holy Child School, Jalpaiguri has a large alumni base. Notable members include:
 
 
 Mimi Chakraborty - Actress, singer and Member of Parliament

See also
Education in India
List of schools in India
Education in West Bengal

References

External links
 Holy Child School Facebook site

Christian schools in West Bengal
Primary schools in West Bengal
High schools and secondary schools in West Bengal
Education in Jalpaiguri
Educational institutions established in 1973
1973 establishments in West Bengal
Schools in Jalpaiguri district